Tower Division is an electoral division in Suffolk which returns two county councillors to Suffolk County Council. It is made up of the central and North West Bury St Edmunds and consists of the West Suffolk council wards of Miden, St Olaves, Tollgate, and Abbeygate along with a small part of Westgate ward between the River Linnet, Hospital Road, and Petticoat lane.
The first elections for this division were held as part of the 2005 United Kingdom local elections, after the division was created through The County of Suffolk (Electoral Changes) Order 2004

Elections
Both seats of the division are currently held by Conservative party after David Nettleton defected to the Conservatives in December 2019 having been elected as an independent.

2021

2017

2013

2009

2005

References

Electoral Divisions of Suffolk